Jetwing Hotels Limited is a Sri Lankan hotel chain. Jetwing was founded in the 1970s by Herbert Cooray when he purchased the Blue Oceanic Hotel in Negombo from its Swedish owner Vingressor and renamed it Jetwing. Cooray founded Jetwing Travels in 1981. Jetwing Hotels' current chairman, Hiran Cooray, is the son of Herbert Cooray. Jetwing Symphony acts as the holding company for the new hotel of the Jetwing Group.

Properties
Jetwing Hotels operates several hotels and villas across Sri Lanka:

Hotels
 Calamansi Cove Villas by Jetwing, Balapitiya
 Saman Villas, Bentota
 Jetwing Colombo Seven, Colombo
 Jetwing Lake, Dambulla
 Jetwing Lighthouse, Galle
 Jetwing Jaffna, Jaffna
 North Gate by Jetwing, Jaffna
 Mermaid Hotel & Club, Kalutara
 Jetwing Kandy Gallery, Kandy
 Jetwing Ayurveda Pavilions, Negombo
 Jetwing Beach, Negombo
 Jetwing Blue, Negombo
 Jetwing Sea, Negombo
 Jetwing Lagoon, Negombo
 Jetwing St. Andrew's, Nuwara Eliya
 Jie Jie Beach by Jetwing, Panadura
 Jetwing Surf, Pottuvil
 Jetwing Vil Uyana, Sigiriya
 Jetwing Kaduruketha, Wellawaya
 Jetwing Safari Camp, Yala
 Jetwing Yala, Yala
 Off Broadway Motel, Auckland, New Zealand

Villas

 Dedduwa Boat House, Bentota
 Yathra Houseboat by Jetwing, Bentota
 Jetwing Kurulubedda, Galle
 Jetwing Mahesa Bhawan, Jaffna
 Jetwing Thalahena Villas, Negombo
 Jetwing Warwick Gardens, Nuwara Eliya
 The Cottage by Jetwing, Nuwara Eliya
 Oatlands by Jetwing, Nuwara Eliya
 Meena Amma's Tea Experience, Nuwara Eliya
 Kottukal Beach House by Jetwing, Pottuvil

References

Privately held companies of Sri Lanka
Hotel chains in Sri Lanka